In the Doubles competition of the 1988 Virginia Slims of California tennis tournament, Hana Mandlíková and Wendy Turnbull were the defending champions but they competed with different partners: Mandlíková with Jana Novotná and Turnbull with Zina Garrison.

Garrison and Turnbull lost in the quarterfinals to Mary Joe Fernández and Terry Phelps.

Mandlíková and Novotná lost in the final 6–4, 6–4 to Rosemary Casals and Martina Navratilova.

Seeds
Champion seeds are indicated in bold text while text in italics indicates the round in which those seeds were eliminated.

 Zina Garrison /  Wendy Turnbull (quarterfinals)
 Gigi Fernández /  Lori McNeil (quarterfinals)
 Elise Burgin /  Robin White (quarterfinals)
 Hana Mandlíková /  Jana Novotná (final)

Draw

External links
 1988 Virginia Slims of California Doubles draw

Silicon Valley Classic
1988 WTA Tour